Katong Constituency was a constituency in Singapore from 1951 until 1959 and from 1968 until 1984. 

In 1991, the constituency was carved out from Municipal North–East Constituency and was represented in the Legislative Council from 1951 until 1955. In 1955, parts of the constituency was carved out to form Geylang and Paya Lebar constituencies but it remained represented in the Legislative Assembly of Singapore from 1955 until 1959 where it was abolished. The constituency was split into Joo Chiat, Mountbatten and Siglap constituencies. In 1968, the constituency was reformed by carving out from Mountbatten Constituency and lasted till 1984 where it was once again abolished and split into Joo Chiat and Mountbatten constituencies.

Member of Parliament

Elections

Elections in the 1980s

Elections in the 1970s

Elections in the 1960s

Elections in the 1950s

Historical maps

References 

Singaporean electoral divisions
Marine Parade